Mem Ferda (born 30 October 1963 in London) is a British actor and film producer of Turkish Cypriot descent.

Biography
Ferda was born in Chelsea, London in 1963 to Turkish Cypriot parents. At the age of six, his mother took him to Cyprus, where his father was the Minister of Agriculture. The family emigrated back to London when he was 12 years old, following an assassination attempt on his father. Whilst studying, Ferda achieved two university degrees, a BSc Honors degree in Psychology and a master's degree in Business Administration (M.B.A.). He then began acting in television commercials and was eventually accepted and graduated from the London Academy of Music and Dramatic Art with a Postgraduate Diploma in acting. He has become known for playing the roles of villains.

Filmography

Theatre credits 
 Dr.Dudakov in Summerfolk
 Shylock in The Merchant of Venice
 Bosola in The Duchess of Malfi
 Francis Flute in A Midsummer Night's Dream
 Brutus in Julius Caesar
 Terrance in Fucking Games

Personal life
Ferda is the cousin of İrsen Küçük, the Prime Minister of the Turkish Republic of Northern Cyprus between 2010 and 2013.

References

External links 
 
 
 Mem Ferda: Larger than Life by Jamie Garwood.

1963 births
Living people
British male film actors
British people of Turkish Cypriot descent
Male actors from London
Alumni of the London Academy of Music and Dramatic Art
20th-century British male actors
21st-century British male actors
British male stage actors
British male television actors
British male actors